Alexander Raichev (11 April 1922 – 28 October 2003) was a Bulgarian music educator and composer.

Raichev was born in Lom, Bulgaria, and studied with Pancho Vladigerov at the State Musical Academy in Sofia where he graduated in 1947. He then studied with Zoltán Kodály and Janos Ferencsik at the Budapest Conservatory from 1949-50. After completing his studies, he taught at the Bulgarian State Conservatory, serving as Rector from 1970 to 1978. Notable students include Rosica Petkova.

In 1969 Vasheto prisatvie (Your Presence) was the earliest Bulgarian radio opera to be broadcast.

Selected works
1937:      Suite for chamber orchestra
1943:      Largo and Scherzo for string orchestra
1945:      Symphonic Suite for orchestra
1947:      Piano Concerto  (lost)
1949–50:   Symphony No.1: Symphony/Cantata “He Shall Not Die” for chorus and orchestra   
1949–50    “Pioneers Suite” for female chorus and orchestra
1953:      Ballet “Haidouk Song” (and two Ballet Suites, 1954 and 1955)
1953       Oratorio “Dimitrov still Lives” for soloist, narrator, male chorus and orchestra
1954:      Oratorio “Friendship” for bass, chorus and orchestra
1954:      Sonata-Poem for Violin and Orchestra   
1955:      Suite for chamber orchestra
1958:      Symphony No.2 “The New Prometheus”    
1962:      Four Miniatures for string orchestra
1966:      Symphony No.3 “Strivings”    
1966       Overture “Bright Day”
1967:      Oratorio “October 1950” for mezzo-soprano, baritone, chorus and orchestra
1968:      Symphony No.4 for string orchestra    
1970:      Symphonic Glorification “Lenin Generations” for orchestra
1971:      Overture “Bright Dawn”
1972:      Symphony No.5 for chamber orchestra
1972:      Symphonic Moments “Leipzig ‘33” for orchestra
1974:      Academic Overture
1975:      Festival Overture
1978:      Ballet “The Fountain of the White-legged Woman” (and Ballet Suite)
1979:      Cantata “Varna”
1979:      Concerto for Orchestra     
1983:      Balkan Rhapsody for orchestra
1983:      Concert March No.1 for wind orchestra
1984:      March for wind orchestra
1985:      Concert March No.2 for wind orchestra
1986:      Jubilee Overture
1986:      Overture “Eulogy”
1986:      Ballad for the Unknown Soldier for bass and wind orchestra
1987:      “Thoughts about the Master sketches” for string orchestra
1987:      Overture “Levski” for wind orchestra
1988:      Cantata “Shipka” for soloists, narrators, male chorus and orchestra
1989:      Triptych for clarinet, piano, strings and percussion
1991:      Oratorio “Kabile” for narrator, chorus and orchestra
1992:      Romantic Concerto for Violin and Orchestra
1994:      Symphony No.6 “Liturgical”
1995:      Partita melancolica for string orchestra
1998:      Symphonic Episodes for orchestra

Opera
1962:      Slaveyat na Orkhideyata (The Nightingale of the Orchid) - (operetta, V. Bashev after P. Panchev), Sofia State Music - March 6, 1962
1965:      Most (The Bridge) - (Bashev), Ruse Opera, October 2, 1965
1969:      Vasheto prisastvie (Your Presence) - Radio Sofia, Sept. 5, 1969. 
1980:      Blagoevgrad Chamber Opera
1974:      Trevoga (Anxiety) - (O. Orlinov, after O. Vassilev), Sofia National Opera, 1974

References

1922 births
2003 deaths
20th-century classical composers
Bulgarian classical composers
Bulgarian opera composers
Male classical composers
Male opera composers
Bulgarian music educators
20th-century male musicians
Bulgarian expatriates in Hungary